Hans Pfenninger (16 September 1929 – 17 December 2009) was a Swiss cyclist. He competed at the 1948 and 1952 Summer Olympics.

References

1929 births
2009 deaths
Swiss male cyclists
Olympic cyclists of Switzerland
Cyclists at the 1948 Summer Olympics
Cyclists at the 1952 Summer Olympics
Cyclists from Zürich